Brampton is a market town, civil parish and electoral ward within the City of Carlisle district of Cumbria, England, about  east of Carlisle and  south of Hadrian's Wall. Historically part of Cumberland, it is situated off the A69 road which bypasses it.

St Martin's Church is famous as the only church designed by the Pre-Raphaelite architect Philip Webb, and contains one of the most exquisite sets of stained glass windows designed by Sir Edward Burne-Jones, and executed in the William Morris studio.

History
The town is thought to have been founded in the 7th century as an Anglian settlement.

The place-name 'Brampton' is first attested in Charter Rolls of 1252, where it appears as Braunton. In the Taxatio Ecclesiastica of 1291 it appears as Brampton. The name derives from the Old English 'Brōm-tūn', meaning "town or settlement where broom grew".

Its original church survives a couple of miles away to the west as Brampton Old Church, on the site of a Stanegate Roman fort.

The town is overlooked by the large medieval motte known as The Mote, which is surmounted by a statue of George Howard, 7th Earl of Carlisle.

Brampton was granted a Market Charter in 1252 by King Henry III, and became a market town as a result.

During the Jacobite rising of 1745, Charles Edward Stuart ('Bonnie Prince Charlie') stayed in the town for one night, marked by a plaque on the wall of the building (an antique shop) currently occupying the location; here he received the Mayor of Carlisle who had been summoned to Brampton to surrender the city to the Young Pretender. The Capon Tree Monument, to the south of the town centre, commemorates the 1746 hanging of six Jacobites from the branches of the Capon Tree, Brampton's hitherto traditional trysting place.

In 1817 the Earl of Carlisle built the octagonal Moot Hall, which is in the centre of Brampton and houses the Tourist Information Centre. It replaced a 1648 building which was once used by Oliver Cromwell to house prisoners. To the right of its door can be seen the old town iron stocks affixed to the pavement.

Brampton was granted Fairtrade status on 6 January 2005, becoming one of the first hundred towns in the UK to be recognised in this way. Brampton Primary School was awarded Fairtrade status in Spring 2007 and RAF Spadeadam became Britain's first military base to sign up to Fairtrade.

In 2011, Brampton became the 66th town in the United Kingdom and the second in Cumbria to gain Walkers are Welcome status.

Much of Brampton consists of historic buildings built of the local red sandstone.

Transport

The town is served by bus service 685 which operates between Carlisle and Newcastle upon Tyne. Brampton railway station, on the Newcastle and Carlisle Railway, is about a mile outside the town, near the hamlet of Milton.

Governance
Brampton is in the parliamentary constituency of Penrith and the Border. Neil Hudson was elected its Conservative Member of Parliament at the 2019 General Election, replacing Rory Stewart. Mark Green is the current standing mayor

Before Brexit, it was in the North West England European Parliamentary Constituency.

Education
Brampton's secondary school is the William Howard School, known as Irthing Valley School until 1980 when it was amalgamated with Brampton's White House School and took on a larger catchment area, with pupils from as far away as Alston and Penrith.

Culture
William Howard School was host to 'Brampton Live' every summer, an ever-growing music festival that, after its first appearance in 1995, became the largest folk/roots/world music festival in the North of England. Major artists included the Levellers, the Waterboys, Egudo Embako, Richard Thompson, Suzanne Vega, Loudon Wainwright III, Altan, Tommy Emmanuel, Seth Lakeman and many others. The last 'Brampton Live' took place in 2009 and has been, to a certain extent, replaced in 2012 by the 'Stepping Stones Festival' organised by Maddy Prior (of Steeleye Span) held in early May at the Brampton Community Centre.

Sport
The Brampton to Carlisle 10 Mile Road Race organised by Border Harriers & Athletic Club is the oldest 10 mile road race in the United Kingdom and is held in November. The first race was completed in 1952. Previous winners include Steve Cram and Ron Hill.

Weather

Brampton has a Met Office Weather Station, established in 1999. It records weather data on a daily basis, which is forwarded to the Met Office. It is thought that there have been two other weather stations in Brampton, last one connected to a former secondary school in the area.

Notable residents
Geoff Twentyman, a footballer who made over 150 appearances each for both Carlisle United and Liverpool, was born and brought up in Brampton; as a scout for Liverpool he recommended the likes of Kevin Keegan, John Toshack, Peter Beardsley and John Barnes, amongst others, to the managers he worked under. Altogether he spent twenty years as head scout of Liverpool F.C.

Li Yuan-chia (1929–1994), was a notable Chinese artist, poet and curator, and a significant influence on contemporary Chinese art. Born in Guangxi province, he lived the last twenty-six years of his life in Brampton, Cumbria, where he founded the LYC Gallery and Museum, which exhibited his own works and those of other notable artists.

Brampton and Beyond Community Trust
Brampton and Beyond Community Trust is a community-based development trust serving Brampton and the surrounding area in north east Cumbria. The Trust is a registered company and a registered charity. The Trust aims to provide accessible, affordable and responsive services for local people and seeks to be self-financing. In 2011, Brampton and Beyond Community Trust formally took over the assets of the former Brampton Community Association, together with responsibility for the operation of the Brampton Community Centre. Subsequently, in 2015 the Trust negotiated the asset transfer of site which Brampton Community Centre occupies from Cumbria County Council making the Trust both the owners and operators of Brampton Community Centre.

See also

Listed buildings in Brampton, Carlisle
Brampton, Ontario

External links
  Cumbria County History Trust: Brampton (nb: provisional research only - see Talk page)

References

 
Market towns in Cumbria
Cumberland
Civil parishes in Cumbria
Towns in Cumbria
City of Carlisle